Nuskova is a village in the Municipality of Rogašovci in the Prekmurje region of northeastern Slovenia.

There is a small chapel in the settlement dedicated to the Holy Trinity. It was built in 1925 and has a small belfry.

References

External links
Nuskova on Geopedia

Populated places in the Municipality of Rogašovci